The University of Greenwich is a public university located in London and Kent, United Kingdom. Previous names include Woolwich Polytechnic and Thames Polytechnic.

The university's main campus is at the Old Royal Naval College, which along with its Avery Hill campus, is located in the Royal Borough of Greenwich. Greenwich also has a satellite campus in Medway, Kent, as part of a shared campus. The university's range of subjects includes architecture, business, computing, mathematics, education, engineering, humanities, maritime studies, natural sciences, pharmacy and social sciences. Greenwich's alumni include two Nobel laureates: Abiy Ahmed and Charles K. Kao. It received a Silver rating in the UK government's Teaching Excellence Framework.

History

The university dates back to 1891, when Woolwich Polytechnic, the second-oldest polytechnic in the United Kingdom, opened in Woolwich. It was founded by Frank Didden, supported by and following the principles of Quintin Hogg, and opened to students in October 1891. Like Hogg's pioneering venture in London's Regent Street, it initially combined education with social and religious functions.

In 1894 it focused on an educational role, concentrating on higher technical education appropriate to its location close to Woolwich Dockyard and the Royal Arsenal; William Anderson, director-general of the Ordnance Factories, was a trustee and later a member of the board of governors. Its premises were also used for day schools – the first Woolwich Polytechnic School was established in 1897.

In 1970, Woolwich Polytechnic merged with part of Hammersmith College of Art and Building to form Thames Polytechnic. In the following years, Dartford College (1976), Avery Hill College of Education (1985), Garnett College (1987) and parts of Goldsmiths College and the City of London College (1988) were incorporated.

In 1992, Thames Polytechnic was granted university status by the Major government (together with various other polytechnics) and renamed the University of Greenwich in 1993. On 1 January 1993, the Thames College of Health Care Studies, itself a merger of three local nursing and midwifery training schools, officially merged with the newly designated University of Greenwich, becoming a full faculty of the university.

Formerly a UK government research agency, the Natural Resources Institute (NRI) was incorporated into the university in 1996.

In 2001, the university gave up its historic main campus in the Bathway Quarter in Woolwich, relocating to its current main campus in Greenwich.

Campuses

Greenwich Campus

Greenwich Campus is located mainly in the Old Royal Naval College, into which it moved in the 1990s when the premises were sold by the Royal Navy.

The campus is home to the Business School and the Faculty of Liberal Arts and Sciences. The campus also includes university's Greenwich Maritime Institute, a specialist maritime management, policy and history teaching and research institute. The Old Royal Naval College also hosts "The Painted Hall", which was painted in the 18th century by Sir James Thornhill, which covers over 40,000 square feet of surface in 200 painting of kings, queens and mythological creatures.

The campus has a large library at Stockwell Street which houses an extensive collection of books and journals, language labs and a 300-PC computing facility.
Other facilities include specialist computer laboratories including one at Dreadnought centre, a TV studio and editing suites.
The Stephen Lawrence Gallery at the Stockwell Street building, showcases the work of contemporary artists and is linked to the School of Design.

Avery Hill Campus

The Avery Hill Campus comprises two sites, Mansion and Southwood. Both are situated in the 86-acre Avery Hill Park in the Royal Borough of Greenwich, south-east London.

The campus is home to the Faculty of Education & Health. Facilities include computer laboratories, a library and a TV studio, as well as a sports and teaching centre with a sports hall and 220-seat lecture theatre. Southwood site also has clinical skills laboratories. These replicate NHS wards, enabling trainee health professionals to gain hands-on experience. The village complex provides student accommodation, a general shop and a launderette. The Dome, in the centre of the complex, houses a food outlet and gym. Rugby, football, indoor pitches, netball and tennis courts, and a dance studio are on Avery Hill campus.

The facility, which was built by Wimpey Construction under a PFI contract, was completed in 1996.

The Winter Garden, the centrepiece of the Mansion site, has fallen into neglect and is on Historic England's 'At Risk' Register. A campaign to restore the Winter Garden is putting pressure on the university and Greenwich Council to ensure its future.

Medway Campus

The Medway Campus is located on a former Royal Navy shorebase (called HMS Pembroke) opened in 1903 at Chatham Maritime, Kent.

The Faculty of Engineering and Science is based here, as is the Natural Resources Institute, a centre for research, consultancy and education in natural and human resources. It is also the home of Medway School of Pharmacy, a joint school operated by the Universities of Greenwich and Kent. The Faculty of Education & Health offers a number of its programmes at Medway. Facilities include laboratories, workshops, a computer-aided design studio and a training dispensary.

The Drill Hall Library is a learning resource centre with a library, computers, study areas and teaching rooms. Social facilities include a sports hall, bar, gym and outdoor tennis courts. The university is a member of Universities at Medway, a partnership of educational establishments at Chatham Maritime that is developing the area as a major higher education centre in the Medway region.

Organisation
Greenwich has four faculties:
 Faculty of Liberal Arts and Sciences
 Business School
 Faculty of Education and Health
 Faculty of Engineering and Science

Student life
Greenwich Campus is near 74-hectare Greenwich Park, home to the Royal Observatory, Greenwich. The Stockwell Street Building opened in 2014 and is now home to the campus library, film and TV studios, and state-of-the-art editing suites. In 2015, it was shortlisted for the Stirling Prize for excellence in architecture.

The Dreadnought Building is a central hub for the Greenwich Campus, with further teaching and social spaces.

The Student Village at Avery Hill Campus provides accommodation for around 1,000 students. On-site facilities include a café, canteen, shop, launderette, bicycle parking, and a gym.

Medway Campus has 350 rooms across five halls of residence dedicated to student accommodation.

Students' Union

Greenwich Students' Union is the university's students' union. In October 2019, the GSU Student Assembly voted to ask the university to declare a climate emergency and for the university and union sustainability strategies to consult with students in creating them. This call to action aimed to speed up the university's efforts at becoming carbon neutral.

At the Medway campus in Kent there is a partnership between the University of Greenwich Students' Union, Canterbury Christ Church and University of Kent Union on the Medway campus. Greenwich Students' Union has been leading the partnership since July 2021 and manages The Hub space, previously The Student Hub when it was looked after by GK Unions – the Greenwich & Kent Students' Unions Together (once the Universities at Medway Students Association, UMSA).

Greenwich Students' Union delivers at Avery Hill, Greenwich and Medway campus.

Research

Greenwich research seeks to influence and enhance health, education, science, engineering, computing and social policy, and attracts international agencies, government departments and global corporations (for example, Pfizer, GlaxoSmithKline, BAE Systems, Airbus, GE Aviation and Merck Consumer Health) from over 50 countries. Significant areas of research and consultancy include landscape architecture, employment relations, fire safety, natural resources, tourism and hospitality, social network analysis, education, training, educational leadership and public services.

Examples of research
 The university's Natural Resources Institute has developed an artificial cow that attracts and kills the tsetse fly. This was recognised by a Universities UK survey in 2009 as one of the ten most important discoveries to be made in a UK university over the past 60 years.
 The Fire Safety Engineering Group, part of the School of Computing & Mathematical Sciences, is a world leader in computational fire engineering, including expertise in aircraft, building, ship and rail evacuation and fire modelling. It has developed airEXODUS, a leading evacuation model in the aviation industry.
 A University of Greenwich research team helped restore the Cutty Sark after it was badly damaged by fire.
 Researchers working on 19 sustainable development and agriculture projects in India helped the university to win the 2010 Times Higher Education Award for Outstanding International Strategy.
 Two University of Greenwich scientists have developed a technology which converts contaminated land and industrial waste into harmless pebbles, capturing large amounts of carbon dioxide at the same time.
 The Greenwich Maritime Institute makes internationally recognised contributions to research in maritime history and economics, such as its exploration of the governance of the River Thames since the 1960s and the effects this has had on the economic development of adjacent communities.

Rankings

The university was ranked 94 out of 121 UK institutions according to The Guardian University Guide 2022 league table. For 2023, the University of Greenwich was ranked 60 according to Times Higher education (THE). Moreover, University of Greenwich ranked first in London for Events, Tourism and Hospitality by the Guardian’s 2023 university rankings.Subjects taught at Greenwich have seen rises in the Guardian university league tables for 2022: Chemistry was at 10, up 10 places since 2021. Forensic Science (9), Criminology (10), Mechanical Engineering (12), and Education (48) also moved up significantly.

The university is ranked as the #1 modern university in London and top overall in Kent for graduate prospects according to The Times and Sunday Times Good University Guide 2021.

In Center for World University Rankings World University Rankings 2020–21 – University of Greenwich was ranked 76 in the UK. In 2022, University of Greenwich was ranked in the 750-800 range globally by QS World University Rankings.

In the Times Higher Education (THE) Impact Rankings 2020, Greenwich performed well in several categories:
 Responsible Consumption and Production (24th)
 Life on Land (66th)
 Reduced Inequalities (68th)
 Climate Action (75th)
 Partnership for the Goals (77th)

Awards
In 2012, the university was rated as the greenest in the UK by People & Planet Green League Table. In 2019, it was ranked 14 in UK, and third in London.

It has won two Guardian University Awards, four Queen's Anniversary Prizes for Higher and Further Education, including the Research Impact prize two years running in 2014 and 2015. The university has also won nine Times Higher Education awards, including:
Most Innovative Teacher,
Outstanding Engineering Research,
Outstanding International Strategy,
Outstanding Contribution to Innovation and Technology,
Outstanding Contribution to Sustainable Development.

In 2019, the university's Natural Resources Institute was awarded a Queen's Anniversary Prize for its research in pest management and control to combat human and animal diseases in the UK and internationally; in 2015 it won a prize for work on the cassava crop in Africa.

Since 2014, the university has been classified as Silver in Teaching Excellence Framework (TEF) of Higher Education.

Cafeteria workers' dispute 
In 2019, the university's main cafeteria was operated by BaxterStorey, which paid its workers £9.25 per hour without contractual sick pay. After a chef had collapsed on his way home from a shift during a typical 80-hour week, all workers joined UVW union. After four strike days in October 2019, and protests disrupting the annual graduation ceremony and a board meeting, Greenwich University announced in early January 2020 that all outsourced cafe workers, cleaners and security guards would receive the London living wage of £10.55, in addition to the same sick pay and annual leave as university staff.

Partnership with Charlton Athletic
In 2018, the University of Greenwich started a partnership with Charlton Athletic F.C.

Notable alumni

Prominent alumni of the university and its predecessor organisations include Nobel Laureate Charles Kao, who was awarded the Nobel Prize in Physics in 2009 for his work on transmission of light in fibre optics, and Abiy Ahmed, who won the 2019 Nobel Peace Prize. In June 2021, representatives from multiple countries called for the award of the Nobel Peace Prize to Abiy to be re-considered because of the war crimes committed in Tigray. Two British government ministers, Richard Marsh and Gareth Thomas, are also graduates. A more extensive list is given below.

 Abiy Ahmed, Prime Minister of Ethiopia and Nobel Peace prize winner
 Jamie 'JME' Adenuga, MC
 Bola Agbaje, playwright
 Helen Bailey, writer
 Natasha Bedingfield, pop singer (did not graduate)
 John Behr, theologian
 Malorie Blackman, children's author
Demitu Hambisa Bonsa, Ethiopian government minister
 John Boyega, actor, best known for Star Wars: The Force Awakens
 Sheila Bromberg, musician
 Liam Brown, author
 Campbell Christie, chairman of Falkirk F.C.
 Terry Christian, radio and television presenter
 Mark Daly, Irish senator
 Siobhan Dowd, writer (A Swift Pure Cry)
 Sarah Eberle, garden designer
 Jenni Fagan, author
 Leo Fortune-West, professional footballer
 Sarah Gillespie, singer-songwriter
 Pippa Guard, actress
 Gareth Hale, comedian
 Patrick Harrington, politician in the National Front (1979–1989) and currently Third Way (UK) think tank; general secretary of Solidarity – The Union for British Workers
 Rachael Heyhoe-Flint, cricketer
 Brian Jacks, 1972 Summer Olympics bronze medallist in Judo
 Mark Jackson, musician (VNV Nation)
 Matt James, musician (Gene)
 Charles K. Kao, Nobel Prize winning scientist
 Graham Kendrick, Christian worship leader
 Sammy Lee, IVF specialist
 Pablo Daniel Magee, writer, journalist and playwright
 Richard Marsh, Baron Marsh, politician
 Rui Moreira, Portuguese politician and businessman; mayor of Porto
 Chinenye Ochuba, former Most Beautiful Girl in Nigeria
 Sarah Ockwell-Smith, childcare author
 Norman Pace, comedian
 Ann Packer, 1964 Summer Olympics gold medallist
 Lara Pulver, Olivier Award-nominated dancer and actress
 Richard Pybus, cricket coach
 Jamie Reynolds, musician (Klaxons)
 George Rose, businessman
 Dave Rowntree, musician (Blur)
 Etienne Schneider, Deputy Prime Minister of Luxembourg
 Peter Skinner, MEP
 Aramazd Stepanian, playwright
 William G. Stewart, TV presenter (Fifteen to One)
 Nina Stibbe, author
Adelle Stripe, author
Joy Onumajuru, model and philanthropist
 Gareth Thomas, politician
 Ewen Whitaker, lunar astronomer (alumnus of Woolwich Polytechnic)
 Joel Willans, author, copywriter and British expat; creator of a popular Finnish social media brand and author of a related book, which makes light fun of stereotypes related to Finland.

See also 
 Armorial of UK universities
 Baron Boateng
 List of universities in the United Kingdom
 Post-1992 universities

References

External links

Official website
Greenwich Students' Union website

 
Educational institutions established in 1992
1992 establishments in England
Greenwich
Buildings and structures in Eltham
Greenwich